Acheux-en-Amiénois is a commune in the Somme department in Hauts-de-France in northern France.

Geography
The commune is a farming village found at the junction of the departmental roads D938 and D114.

History
The earlier spelling of the name Acheux was either Aceu or Acheu (from the charter of the foundation of the nearby abbey of Corbie). It comes from the Celtic Achad that meant "cultivated field".
The town of Acheux is ancient. It certainly existed in Roman times, where a fort was established, comprising ditches and palisades, to protect it from attacks by the Atrebates, a Gaulish tribe, after whom Arras is named.

Within the Commune is the Acheux British Military Cemetery containing war graves from the First World War.

Population

Places and monuments

The church of Acheux was built in 1760 as indicated on the inscription on the font. It is dedicated to Saint Cyr and Saint Juliette.
The castle was constructed in the 11th century and had seven towers, of which two remain. The wall was surrounded by a dry moat filled with brambles and thorns, giving the nickname of "Thorn Manor".

See also
Communes of the Somme department

References

External links

 Acheux-en-Amiénois on the website of l'Institut géographique national
 Statistical data, INSEE
 Official Town website 

Communes of Somme (department)